Gary David Bennett Jr. (born April 17, 1972) is an American former professional baseball catcher, who played in Major League Baseball (MLB) for several teams, from  to  and  to .

Bennett was selected by the Philadelphia Phillies in the 11th round of the 1990 Major League Baseball Draft. He played in the Phillies minor league system from 1990–1996, playing for the Martinsville Phillies (1990–1991), Batavia Clippers (1992), Spartanburg Phillies (1993), Clearwater Phillies (1993–1994), Reading Phillies (1994–1995), Scranton/Wilkes-Barre Red Barons (1995–1996).

He was signed as a free agent by the Boston Red Sox in  season and spent the season with the Pawtucket Red Sox. He returned to the Phillies organization the following year as a minor league free agent. Played most of the season with Scranton before his contract was purchased by the Phillies in September. 1998 was his first full season in the majors and he stayed with the Phillies as a backup catcher to Mike Lieberthal until he was traded to the New York Mets for fellow catcher Todd Pratt on July 23, . Bennett played in one big league game for the Mets (going 1–1) before they traded him to the Colorado Rockies a month later.

Bennett came alive in late August 2006. He hit four home runs in the span of a week, including a walk-off grand slam against the Chicago Cubs on August 27, 2006. The four home runs equaled his career high of four home runs in a single season, which he did with the 2002 Colorado Rockies. He hit no other home runs that season. In an exhibition game on March 30, 2007, against the Memphis Redbirds, the Cardinals AAA Minor League affiliate, Bennett, with the game tied 2–2, hit grand slam in the top of the 8th inning, giving the Cardinals the victory. This led many fans to call him, "Gary Grand Slam Bennett".

On November 28, 2006, Bennett was re-signed by the Cardinals.

On November 2, the Cardinals exercised their  buy-out option on his contract.

On December 13, 2007, Bennett was named in the Mitchell Report, which detailed his illegal use of performance-enhancing substances such as human growth hormone.

On December 17, 2007, the Dodgers signed Bennett to a one-year deal to back up Russell Martin, the Dodgers' young All-Star catcher. After signing, Bennett publicly admitted that the Mitchell Report was accurate as far as he was concerned, stating, "As far as the report is concerned to me, it's accurate. Obviously, it was a stupid decision. It was a mistake." Bennett's 2008 season was cut short, however, when he went on the disabled list in mid-May for plantar fasciitis. The ailment would keep Bennett on the disabled list the remainder of the season. Veteran backup Danny Ardoin took Bennett's spot in his absence as Martin's backup. Bennett finished the 2008 campaign with a disappointing .190 batting average with one home run and four RBI in only 10 games played. After the season the Dodgers bought out Bennett's option year, making him a free agent.

See also
 List of Major League Baseball players named in the Mitchell Report

References

External links

Gary Bennett at Baseball Almanac
Gary Bennett at Ultimate Mets Database
Gary Bennett - A Citizen's Voice Podcast (Interview)
Gary Bennett  - TSN.ca

1972 births
Living people
Major League Baseball catchers
Los Angeles Dodgers players
St. Louis Cardinals players
Washington Nationals players
Milwaukee Brewers players
San Diego Padres players
Colorado Rockies players
New York Mets players
Philadelphia Phillies players
Baseball players from Illinois
Batavia Clippers players
Clearwater Phillies players
Reading Phillies players
Scranton/Wilkes-Barre Red Barons players
Pawtucket Red Sox players
Norfolk Tides players
Inland Empire 66ers of San Bernardino players
Las Vegas 51s players
Sportspeople from Waukegan, Illinois